Get Ready is the RIAA Platinum-certified second studio album by American rock band Rare Earth. It was released on September 30, 1969 by Motown Records. The album spawned one hit single, an edited version of "Get Ready", which peaked at #4 on the Billboard Hot 100 chart in 1970.

Track listing

Personnel
Rare Earth
John Persh – vocals, bass guitar, trombone
Pete Rivera – lead vocals, drums
Rod Richards – vocals, guitar
Kenny James – vocals, organ, electric piano
Gil Bridges – vocals, saxophone, tambourine

References

Rare Earth (band) albums
1969 albums
Albums recorded at Hitsville U.S.A.
Motown albums